Hypoxia-inducible factor dioxygenase may refer to:

 Hypoxia-inducible factor-proline dioxygenase
 Hypoxia-inducible factor-asparagine dioxygenase